The Shirdi Sai Baba movement is the religious movement of the followers and devotees of the 19th- and early 20th-century Indian saint Sai Baba of Shirdi (or Shirdi Sai Baba). Sai Baba is a Hindu baba and spiritual guru known for his divine powers and miracles.

References
.

Further reading
Chandra Bhanu Satpathy., Shirdi Sai Baba and Other Perfect Masters, Sterling Publishers, 
Chandra Bhanu Satpathy., Sai Sharan Main (Hindi), Sterling Publishers, 
Chandra Bhanu Satpathy., "Shri Guru Bhagvata" (English), Vision Printers & Publishers, Orissa, India
 Rigopoulos, Antonio The Life and Teachings of Sai Baba of Shirdi State University of New York press, Albany, (1993) .
Ruhela S. P., Sri Shirdi Sai Baba – The Universal Master, Limbus, 2004,  (Polish edition)

External links

Heritage of Shirdi Sai
Official Website on Shirdi Sai Global Foundation
Directory of Sai Baba temples
Shirdi Sai Baba Devotees Experiences
Bhajan of sai baba of shirdi with lyrics

Sai Baba of Shirdi
Hindu new religious movements